O'Garro is a surname.

People with this name include:

 Anthony O'Garro (born 1987), Trinidadian soccer player
 Lenford O'Garro (born 1965), Vincentian sprinter
 Leovan O'Garro (born 1987), Montserratian soccer player
 Melesha O'Garro (born 1988), British musician

See also

 
 Garro (surname)
 Garros (disambiguation)